Joseph Freeman Farm is a historic farm complex and national historic district located near Gates, Gates County, North Carolina. The district encompasses six contributing buildings, one contributing site, and three contributing structures.  The main house was built about 1821, and is a two-story, two-bay dwelling in a transitional Georgian / Federal style. A separate two-room kitchen/dining room ell was added about 1915.  Associated with the house are the contributing  smokehouse (c. 1935), privy (c. 1935), pump house (c. 1947), and domestic well (19th century).  Contributing farm outbuildings include the lot well (c. 1915), equipment shelter (c. 1920), feed and livestock barn (c. 1920), and slave / tenant house (mid- to late-19th century).

It was listed on the National Register of Historic Places in 1999.

References

Farms on the National Register of Historic Places in North Carolina
Historic districts on the National Register of Historic Places in North Carolina
Federal architecture in North Carolina
Queen Anne architecture in North Carolina
Houses completed in 1821
Buildings and structures in Gates County, North Carolina
National Register of Historic Places in Gates County, North Carolina